Alyaksandr Vladimirovich Taykow (born 23 June 1970) is a retired Belarusian professional footballer. Besides Belarus, he has played in Israel.

Honours
Dinamo Minsk
Belarusian Premier League champion: 1992, 1992–93, 1993–94, 1994–95, 1995
Belarusian Cup winner: 1992, 1993–94

References

External links
 

1970 births
Living people
Soviet footballers
Belarusian footballers
Belarus international footballers
FC Dinamo Minsk players
Maccabi Herzliya F.C. players
Hapoel Ashkelon F.C. players
Hapoel Ashdod F.C. players
Liga Leumit players
Soviet Top League players
Belarusian expatriate footballers
Expatriate footballers in Israel
Belarusian expatriate sportspeople in Israel
Association football defenders
Sportspeople from Nizhny Novgorod